Bogdan Globa (born 26 May 1988) is a Ukrainian LGBT rights activist who claimed asylum in the United States in 2016 and in 2018 founded ProudUkraine.

In 2009, Globa co-founded the charity "Point of Support", later working as its CEO. After completing a course on "Advocacy of LGBT rights in the USA", he founded "TERGO" a support organization for parents of LGBT+ children.

On 7 November 2013, speaking during parliamentary hearings on European integration and anti-discrimination legislation, Globa was the first openly LGBT person to address Verkhovna Rada, the Ukrainian parliament.

On 26 May 2015 the Holosiivskyi District Court of Kyiv opened proceedings to establish the existence of discrimination on the grounds of sexual orientation on the suit of Bogdan Globa to the Democratic Alliance (Ukraine). The case is pending before the European Court of Human Rights.

In early 2021, Bogdan married his partner in a private ceremony in Washington DC. They currently reside in New York.

References

External links
 

Living people
1988 births
People from Zachepylivka
Ukrainian LGBT rights activists
Ukrainian gay men
21st-century Ukrainian LGBT people